Invesco PowerShares (formerly PowerShares Capital Management) is an American boutique investment management firm based near Chicago which manages a family of exchange-traded funds or ETFs. The company has been part of Invesco, which markets the PowerShares product, since 2006.

Created in 2002, PowerShares funds use quantitative indices as a benchmark. There are currently over 120 PowerShares ETFs.

PowerShares cover and emulate a variety of market indices; for example, the PowerShares QQQ is designed to replicate the NASDAQ-100 Index. The PowerShares QQQ is one of the most widely traded shares on the stock market, according to writer John J. Murphy.

PowerShares ETFs also cover the commodities market, diversified and tiny or microcap stocks. For instance, the PowerShares DB Commodity Index Tracking Fund, or DBC, which it developed with Deutsche Bank, allows for individual investors to invest in commodities by means of its ETF. The PowerShares DB Oil Fund (DBO) deals with the crude oil index.

History
The company was founded in 2002 as PowerShares Capital Management.

In 2006 PowerShares Capital Management was acquired by Invesco so that Invesco could get access to the ETF business and the company was renamed Invesco PowerShares.

In 2006, PowerShares offered an exchange traded fund in the private equity market in a "diversified fashion", although a report in BusinessWeek suggested that analysts thought that the fund was "something people can live without".

In 2005, PowerShares developed a fund to allow customers to invest in "tiny companies" or microcaps; according to a report in the New York Times, the Powershares Zacks Micro Cap Portfolio owns 330 stocks which follow the index of Zacks Investment Research, and the PowerShares ETF re-evaluates these tiny companies weekly, removing those which "do not pass muster". In addition, the microcap ETF rebalances the entire index each quarter, according to the report.

In 2010, the firm was involved in a trademark infringement dispute with Select Sector SPDR Trust over whether trading symbols, or tickers, could be considered as brand names.

In 2013 the William F. Sharpe Award for ETF Product of the Year went to the PowerShares Senior Loan Portfolio ETF .

Selected funds

Access – Active 
PowerShares Active U.S. Real Estate Fund
PowerShares China A-Share Portfolio
PowerShares Multi-Strategy Alternative Portfolio
PowerShares S&P 500 Downside Hedged Portfolio

Access – Broad Market Beta 
PowerShares QQQ

Access – Buybacks 
PowerShares Buyback Achievers Portfolio
PowerShares International BuyBack Achievers? Portfolio

Access – Global region and country 
BLDRS Asia 50 ADR Index Fund
BLDRS Developed Markets 100 ADR Index Fund
BLDRS Emerging Markets 50 ADR Index Fund
BLDRS Europe Select ADR Index Fund
PowerShares Golden Dragon China Portfolio
PowerShares India Portfolio

Access – Small Cap Sector 
PowerShares S&P SmallCap Consumer Discretionary Portfolio
PowerShares S&P SmallCap Consumer Staples Portfolio
PowerShares S&P SmallCap Energy Portfolio
PowerShares S&P SmallCap Financials Portfolio
PowerShares S&P SmallCap Health Care Portfolio
PowerShares S&P SmallCap Industrials Portfolio
PowerShares S&P SmallCap Information Technology Portfolio
PowerShares S&P SmallCap Materials Portfolio
PowerShares S&P SmallCap Utilities Portfolio

Access – Specialty Sector 
PowerShares Aerospace & Defense Portfolio
PowerShares Emerging Markets Infrastructure Portfolio
PowerShares Global Listed Private Equity Portfolio
PowerShares KBW Bank Portfolio
PowerShares KBW Capital Markets Portfolio
PowerShares KBW Insurance Portfolio
PowerShares KBW Property & Casualty Insurance Portfolio
PowerShares KBW Regional Bank Portfolio
PowerShares NASDAQ Internet Portfolio

Access – Strategies 
PowerShares NYSE Century Portfolio
PowerShares S&P 500 BuyWrite Portfolio
PowerShares Zacks Micro Cap Portfolio

Commodities and Currencies – Commodity Optimum Yield 
PowerShares DB Agriculture Fund
PowerShares DB Base Metals Fund
PowerShares DB Commodity Index Tracking Fund
PowerShares DB Energy Fund
PowerShares DB Gold Fund
PowerShares DB Oil Fund
PowerShares DB Precious Metals Fund
PowerShares DB Silver Fund

Commodities and Currencies – Currencies 
PowerShares DB G10 Currency Harvest Fund
PowerShares DB US Dollar Index Bearish Fund
PowerShares DB US Dollar Index Bullish Fund

Equity-based resources – Alternative Energy 
PowerShares Cleantech Portfolio
PowerShares Global Clean Energy Portfolio
PowerShares WilderHill Clean Energy Portfolio
PowerShares WilderHill Progressive Energy Portfolio

Equity-based resources – Commodity Equities 
PowerShares Global Agriculture Portfolio
PowerShares Global Gold and Precious Metals Portfolio
PowerShares Global Water Portfolio
PowerShares Water Resources Portfolio

Factor Driven – Broad-Based Momentum 
PowerShares DWA Developed Markets Momentum Portfolio
PowerShares DWA Emerging Markets Momentum Portfolio
PowerShares DWA Momentum Portfolio
PowerShares DWA NASDAQ Momentum Portfolio
PowerShares DWA SmallCap Momentum Portfolio

Factor Driven – High Beta 
PowerShares S&P 500 High Beta Portfolio
PowerShares S&P Emerging Markets High Beta Portfolio
PowerShares S&P International Developed High Beta Portfolio

Factor Driven – High Quality 
PowerShares S&P 500 High Quality Portfolio
PowerShares S&P International Developed High Quality Portfolio

Factor Driven – Low Volatility 
PowerShares S&P 500 Low Volatility Portfolio
PowerShares S&P Emerging Markets Low Volatility Portfolio
PowerShares S&P International Developed Low Volatility Portfolio
PowerShares S&P MidCap Low Volatility Portfolio
PowerShares S&P SmallCap Low Volatility Portfolio

Factor Driven – Sector-Based Momentum 
PowerShares DWA Basic Materials Momentum Portfolio
PowerShares DWA Consumer Cyclicals Momentum Portfolio
PowerShares DWA Consumer Staples Momentum Portfolio
PowerShares DWA Energy Momentum Portfolio
PowerShares DWA Financial Momentum Portfolio
PowerShares DWA Healthcare Momentum Portfolio
PowerShares DWA Industrials Momentum Portfolio
PowerShares DWA Technology Momentum Portfolio
PowerShares DWA Utilities Momentum Portfolio

Fundamentals Weighted – Fundamentals Weighted Equity 
PowerShares FTSE RAFI Asia Pacific ex-Japan Portfolio
PowerShares FTSE RAFI Developed Markets ex-U.S. Portfolio
PowerShares FTSE RAFI Developed Markets ex-U.S. Small-Mid Portfolio
PowerShares FTSE RAFI Emerging Markets Portfolio
PowerShares FTSE RAFI US 1000 Portfolio
PowerShares FTSE RAFI US 1500 Small-Mid Portfolio
PowerShares Fundamental Pure Large Core Portfolio
PowerShares Fundamental Pure Large Growth Portfolio
PowerShares Fundamental Pure Large Value Portfolio
PowerShares Fundamental Pure Mid Core Portfolio
PowerShares Fundamental Pure Mid Growth Portfolio
PowerShares Fundamental Pure Mid Value Portfolio
PowerShares Fundamental Pure Small Core Portfolio
PowerShares Fundamental Pure Small Growth Portfolio
PowerShares Fundamental Pure Small Value Portfolio

Fundamentals Weighted – Fundamentals Weighted Fixed Income 
PowerShares Fundamental Emerging Markets Local Debt Portfolio
PowerShares Fundamental High Yield Corporate Bond Portfolio
PowerShares Fundamental Investment Grade Corporate Bond Portfolio

Income – Equity Income 
PowerShares Dividend Achievers Portfolio
PowerShares High Yield Equity Dividend Achievers Portfolio
PowerShares International Dividend Achievers Portfolio
PowerShares KBW High Dividend Yield Financial Portfolio
PowerShares S&P 500 High Dividend Portfolio

Income – Fixed Income 
PowerShares 1-30 Laddered Treasury Portfolio
PowerShares Build America Bond Portfolio
PowerShares Chinese Yuan Dim Sum Bond Portfolio
PowerShares Emerging Markets Sovereign Debt Portfolio
PowerShares Global Short Term High Yield Bond Portfolio
PowerShares Insured California Municipal Bond Portfolio
PowerShares Insured National Municipal Bond Portfolio
PowerShares Insured New York Municipal Bond Portfolio
PowerShares International Corporate Bond Portfolio
PowerShares Senior Loan Portfolio
PowerShares VRDO Tax-Free Weekly Portfolio

Income – Hybrid Income 
PowerShares CEF Income Composite Portfolio
PowerShares Financial Preferred Portfolio
PowerShares KBW Premium Yield Equity REIT Portfolio
PowerShares Preferred Portfolio
PowerShares Variable Rate Preferred Portfolio

Quantitative – Dynamic Broad-Market 
PowerShares Dynamic Large Cap Growth Portfolio
PowerShares Dynamic Large Cap Value Portfolio
PowerShares Dynamic Market Portfolio

Quantitative – Dynamic Industry 
PowerShares Dynamic Biotechnology & Genome Portfolio
PowerShares Dynamic Building & Construction Portfolio
PowerShares Dynamic Energy Exploration & Production Portfolio
PowerShares Dynamic Food & Beverage Portfolio
PowerShares Dynamic Leisure and Entertainment Portfolio
PowerShares Dynamic Media Portfolio
PowerShares Dynamic Networking Portfolio
PowerShares Dynamic Oil & Gas Services Portfolio
PowerShares Dynamic Pharmaceuticals Portfolio
PowerShares Dynamic Retail Portfolio
PowerShares Dynamic Semiconductors Portfolio
PowerShares Dynamic Software Portfolio

See also
 Invesco
 List of exchange-traded funds
 The Vanguard Group
 iShares
 SPDR

References

Exchange-traded funds
Financial services companies established in 2002
2002 establishments in the United States
2006 mergers and acquisitions